Section 28 may refer to:

Section 28, a former law in England, Wales and Scotland regarding homosexuality
Section 28 of the Canadian Charter of Rights and Freedoms
Section 28 of the Constitution of Australia

See also